Belloa erythraactis is a species of flowering plant in the genus Belloa.

References

Gnaphalieae